The 2017 Rugby League World Cup Europe qualification play-off was a rugby league match that was played on 4 November 2016 at Leigh Sports Village in England. The match decides who was the final European country to qualify for the 2017 Rugby League World Cup, with Italy defeating Russia 76–0.

Background 
On 3 October 2014, the 2017 Rugby League World Cup qualifying competition was announced with three more qualification places being announced for European countries after England, France and Scotland had already qualified courtesy of reaching the 2013 World Cup knock-out stage.

In the final round of European Qualification there were two groups of 3 with the countries that topped both pools advancing straight into the 2017 World Cup while the teams placed second headed into a one-off play-off match held at the Leigh Sports Village to see who will be the 14th and final country to qualify for the 2017 Rugby League World Cup.

Italy qualified for the play-off match after finishing second in group A. They were almost in no need of a play-off match after being 40 minutes away from causing a shock result over Wales in Monza.

While Russia qualified for the play-off match after finishing second in group B.

Squads 
Both teams squads remained unchanged throughout the qualifiers.

Italy

Coach:  Cameron Ciraldo

 * Denotes a rugby union club.

Russia

Coach:  Denis Korolev

 * Denotes a rugby union club.

Match details

With the win Italy became the 14th, and final, team to qualify for the 2017 World Cup.

References 

2016 in rugby league
2017 Rugby League World Cup